Homalattus coriaceus is a jumping spider species in the genus Homalattus that lives in Sierra Leone and South Africa. It was first described by Eugène Simon in 1902.

References

Spiders described in 1902
Fauna of Sierra Leone
Salticidae
Spiders of Africa
Spiders of South Africa
Taxa named by Eugène Simon